Dryophthorus distinguendus was a species of beetle in family Curculionidae. It was endemic to the Hawaiian islands.

Sources 

†
Extinct Hawaiian animals
Beetles described in 1900
Endemic fauna of Hawaii
Extinct beetles
Extinct insects since 1500
Taxonomy articles created by Polbot